Mondulkiri Airport  is a public use airport located near Senmonorom, Môndól Kiri, Cambodia.

See also
List of airports in Cambodia

References

External links 
 Airport record for Mondulkiri Airport at Landings.com

Airports in Cambodia
Buildings and structures in Mondulkiri province